Marco Heering (born 8 May 1970) is a Dutch former professional footballer who played as a forward for Go Ahead Eagles, Willem II and Fortuna Sittard.

He works as assistant manager and under-21 manager at Almere City.

External links
 

1970 births
Living people
Sportspeople from Apeldoorn
Dutch footballers
Association football forwards
Eredivisie players
Go Ahead Eagles players
Willem II (football club) players
Fortuna Sittard players
Footballers from Gelderland